This is a list of awards and nominations for American actor Paul Newman, whose career in motion pictures, television, and on stage spanned over 50 years. He won an Academy Award (which was Best Actor in a Leading Role for The Color of Money) and was nominated on nine other occasions. Newman won two Golden Globe Awards (which was Best Director for Rachel, Rachel and Best Actor in a Supporting Role in Television for Empire Falls) and received four special awards (Most Promising Newcomer - Male, World Favorite Film - Male [twice], and Cecil B. DeMille Award). He has been honored with a star on the Hollywood Walk of Fame.

Awards and nominations

Academy Awards 
The Academy Awards, popularly known as the Oscars, are presented annually by the American Academy of Motion Picture Arts and Sciences (AMPAS) to recognize excellence of professionals in the film industry. Newman was nominated for ten competitive awards and was the recipient of an Honorary Award and the Jean Hersholt Humanitarian Award.

Golden Globe Awards 

The Golden Globe Awards are presented annually by the Hollywood Foreign Press Association (HFPA) to recognize outstanding achievements in the entertainment industry, both domestic and foreign, and to focus wide public attention upon the best in motion pictures and television. Newman won three competitive awards and received the Cecil B. DeMille Award.

Grammy Awards

Tony Awards

Emmy Awards 
The Academy of Television Arts & Sciences (ATAS) honors national prime time television entertainment. Newman was nominated for four Emmys and won once.

National Board of Review 
Newman received the award for Best Actor in 1986 (for The Color of Money) from the U.S. National Board of Review of Motion Pictures.

Other honors
 Newman Day
 Sports Car Club of America Hall of Fame, 2009
 Lime Rock Park, Paul Newman Straight, 2022

References

Lists of awards received by American actor